HSwMS Karlskrona was a destroyer of the Royal Swedish Navy that served during the Second World War and in the Cold War. The destroyer served in the Coastal Fleet during the war, protecting Swedish neutrality and escorting convoys. After the war, the ship was upgraded  between 1950 and 1951 with enhanced fire control and an armament improved with the introduction of the Bofors 40 mm anti-aircraft gun. Ten years later, in 1961, Karlskrona was designated a fast anti-submarine frigate and the torpedo tubes were replaced by Squid mortars. The vessel was decommissioned on 1 July 1974 and broken up in 1979.

Design and development

Power was provided by three Penhoët oil-fired boilers feeding two de Laval geared steam turbines driving two shafts. The ship had two funnels. In trials, the destroyer exceeded .

The main armament consisted of three  K/45 M24C dual-purpose guns produced by Bofors. These were placed in separate mounts on the ship's centreline, with one on the forecastle, one aft and one between the funnels. Air defence consisted six  M/40 autocannons in three twin mounts, also provided by Bofors. Two triple rotating torpedo tube mounts for  torpedoes were aft of the superstructure and two depth charge throwers were carried further towards the stern. Approximately forty mines could also be carried for minelaying. The ship had a complement of 135 officers and ratings.

Construction and career
Karlskrona was laid down by Karlskronavarvet in Karlskrona, launched on 16 June 1939 and commissioned on 12 September the following year. The ship was named for the city and allocated the pennant number J8. On 29 June, the destroyer joined the Coastal Fleet, serving on patrols to protect Swedish neutrality and as an escort for convoys travelling through Swedish waters.

Between 1950 and 1951, the destroyer was given a substantial modernisation. The bridge was enlarged and better fire control was fitted, along with a tripod with radar to replace the pole mast. The armament was updated. The central gun was moved aft to a superfiring position, which greatly enhanced the operational capability as the funnels had restricted fire. The anti-aircraft guns were replaced with four single Bofors  guns.

Karlskrona was rerated a fast frigate on 1 January 1961 along with the rest of the class. In 1963, the torpedo tubes were replaced by two Squid anti-submarine mortars and the destroyer reentered service in the anti-submarine role with the pennant number F79. During the 1960s, the Swedish Navy decided to retire the larger destroyers and frigates in the fleet as newer missile-equipped fast attack craft became the mainstay of the surface fleet. Karlskrona was consequently decommissioned on 1 July 1974. The frigate was used as a target ship before being broken up in 1979.

References

Citations

Bibliography

 
 
 
 
 
 
 
 
 
 
 
 
 

1939 ships
Destroyers of the Swedish Navy
Ships built in Karlskrona
World War II naval ships of Sweden